"Back in the Day (Puff)" is a song recorded by American singer Erykah Badu for her third studio album Worldwide Underground (2003). It was written and produced by Badu, James Poyser and Rashad Smith, and was co-written by Audrie Magget. The song was released as the second and final single from Worldwide Underground in October 2003, by Motown Records.

Track listing
US 12-inch vinyl
 "Back in the Day (Puff)" (album version) – 4:47
 "Back in the Day (Puff)" (radio edit) – 4:27
 "Back in the Day (Puff)" (instrumental) – 4:24

Charts

References

2003 singles
Erykah Badu songs
Motown singles
2003 songs
Songs written by Erykah Badu
Songs written by James Poyser
Songs written by Rashad Smith